WWE Roadblock (known as NXT Roadblock since 2022) is a professional wrestling event series produced by WWE, a Connecticut-based professional wrestling promotion. The event was established in March 2016, and this inaugural event was simply titled Roadblock and aired exclusively on the WWE Network streaming service. The second event was then held in December 2016 under the name Roadblock: End of the Line where in addition to the WWE Network, it also aired on traditional pay-per-view (PPV) outlets. To coincide with the brand extension reintroduced in July 2016, this second event was held exclusively for wrestlers from the Raw brand. Roadblock was discontinued after this second event; however, in March 2022, WWE revived the event for the NXT brand to be held as a television special episode of NXT 2.0 titled NXT Roadblock.

Regardless of when Roadblock is held, its title is a reference to its scheduling. The first event was titled as a reference to its original March position on the "Road to WrestleMania". With the second event held in December, its title was in reference to it being WWE's final PPV of 2016. The third event's title was in reference to its position on the road to NXT Stand & Deliver, the brand's annual WrestleMania week event.

History
The American professional wrestling promotion WWE originally had a house show scheduled for March 12, 2016, at the Ricoh Coliseum in Toronto, Ontario, Canada, and was titled "March to WrestleMania: Live from Toronto." To further build towards the following month's WrestleMania 32, WWE decided to broadcast the event live and exclusively on their online streaming service, the WWE Network. They also renamed the event to Roadblock, which was a reference to its position on the "Road to WrestleMania".

In July that year, WWE reintroduced the brand extension where they again split their roster between the Raw and SmackDown brands where wrestlers were exclusively assigned to perform. Brand-exclusive pay-per-views (PPV) also returned. The Roadblock name was in turn reused for the Raw-exclusive December PPV and WWE Network event. It was titled Roadblock: End of the Line due to it being the final PPV of the year. This would also be the final event to carry the Roadblock name as Roadblock was quietly discontinued with no event scheduled for 2017.

The Roadblock name was revived for a special episode of WWE NXT on March 8, 2022, as "NXT Roadblock"; this event served as a lead-in to Stand & Deliver, NXT's WrestleMania weekend show in Dallas.

Events

See also 
 List of WWE Network events
 List of WWE pay-per-view events

References

External links 

 
Recurring events established in 2016